Minden Elementary School, also known as Minden Grammar School, is a historic school building located at 1638 Mono Avenue in Minden, Nevada. The Renaissance Revival school was built in 1918 at a cost of $14,291. The school replaced the county's first school, a 1908 building known as the "little green schoolhouse". The school operated until it closed in 1980 and now serves as an office building for the Douglas County School District.

The school was added to the National Register of Historic Places in 2008, along with another Douglas County school, the Gardnerville Elementary School.

References

School buildings on the National Register of Historic Places in Nevada
National Register of Historic Places in Douglas County, Nevada
Renaissance Revival architecture in Nevada
Schools in Douglas County, Nevada
School buildings completed in 1918
1918 establishments in Nevada